Business studies, often simply called business, is a field of study that deals with the principles of business, management, and economics. It combines elements of accountancy, finance, marketing, organizational studies, human resource management, and operations. Business studies is a broad subject, where the range of topics is designed to give the student a general overview of the various elements of running a business. The teaching of business studies is known as business education.

Countries in which the subject is taught under the name "business studies" include Mauritius, Oman, South Korea, Argentina, Australia, Bangladesh, Nepal, Brazil, Canada, Hong Kong, India, Ireland, Mexico, Singapore,  Malaysia, Cambodia, Kenya, Poland, Malta, New Zealand, Nigeria, Pakistan, South Africa, Sri Lanka, Sweden, the United Kingdom, Zimbabwe and Indonesia.

United Kingdom

England 
Business studies can be taken as part of the General Certificate of Secondary Education (GCSE) option for Year 9, Year 10 and Year 11 at secondary school and also can be taken as part of a GCE Advanced Level (A-level) course in Year 12 and Year 13. It includes a range of subjects, which give the student general understanding of the various elements of running a business. Subjects covered include, but are not limited to: Business Organization, People in Business, Marketing, Operations & Production, Finance, and Strategic Management.

Scotland 
Business management is an option for National 5 and Higher qualifications. Both National 5 and Higher exams cover Understanding business, People, Finance, and Marketing and operations.

Entry to UK Higher Education 
The University of Cambridge considers business studies not to be a 'traditional academic subject', although taking business studies individually will not disadvantage students as long as it is identified as 'essential' or 'desirable' for the course being applied for. It is also suitable when applying for economics at university, if the college the candidate comes from does not offer the economics A-level individually.

Hungary 
After finishing secondary school, students in Hungary have the option of either taking an accredited 2–4 semester business course and obtaining a certificate, or applying to college or university. Students can also take part in a 2-semester preparatory business course to have a greater chance of getting accepted by a university. Hungarian business education has been organized according to the Bologna system since 2006.

People's Republic of Nepal 
Business studies programmes are widely taught in the Republic of Nepal, where it is taught at every colleges of +2 level and also in colleges that provide A-Levels. A number of universities (public and private) are offering business studies programme under the heading of Business Administration.

South Africa 
In South Africa, Business Studies  can be taken as an elective subject from a student's Grade 10 year through to their Grade 12 year; 
it is offered as part of the standard NSC, as well the IEB (see Matriculation in South Africa).
As elsewhere, the syllabus covers a range of topics designed to give the student general understanding of the various elements of running a business. Accountancy  and Economics  are offered as separate, and more technical, subjects.

India 
Business studies is taught at the secondary level in India as an  academic elective under the Central Board of Secondary Education. It covers management, marketing, and finance.

See also
 Business administration
 Business economics
 Business education

References 

Business education